Krishnankoil is a small village located in Virudhunagar District, in the state of Tamil Nadu, India. It is located near the town of Srivilliputhur and the NH208 (national Highway) and is an educational hub of the West Virudhunagar district.

The name Krishnankoil is made of two words Krishna and kovil. Kovil in Tamil language means temple. So the name means Krishna's temple.

Demography

Language
Tamil language is the local language here. English is taught in schools.

Education 
Kalasalingam University
VPMM Women's College of Engineering

Adjacent communities

References

External links 
 virudhunagar

Villages in Virudhunagar district